Conservation Law Foundation (CLF) is an environmental advocacy organization based in New England. Since 1966, CLF's mission has been to advocate for New England's environment and its communities. CLF's advocacy work takes place across five integrated program areas: Clean Energy & Climate Change, Clean Air & Water, Healthy Oceans, People & Justice, and Healthy Communities. CLF uses the law, science, and the market to create solutions that preserve natural resources, build healthy communities, and sustain a vibrant economy. CLF works to promote renewable energy and fight air and water pollution; build sustainable fishing communities and protect marine habitat; promote public transit and defend public health; achieve environmental justice; and sustain a vibrant, equitable economy.

Conservation Law Foundation is a nonprofit, member-supported organization with offices in Maine, Massachusetts, New Hampshire, Rhode Island and Vermont.

Structure and goals
With offices in nearly every New England state (Connecticut being the only exception), CLF works to solve the most significant environmental problems that threaten New England. CLF’s strategies of advocacy concentrate on areas of law, public policy, economics, and science. CLF both defends environmental policy through litigation and petitions and creates it through legislative and regulatory advocacy.

As a result, CLF works to bring local environmental concerns to the attention of legislators and policymakers, and serve as a resource for communicating these concerns throughout the region.

Notable achievements
Founded in 1966 to stop the development of ski slopes on Massachusetts' highest peak, Mount Greylock, CLF has since expanded its advocacy to address both environmental and community issues in all six New England states.

Traditional environmental advocacy
In 1977, the organization successfully fought the expansion plans for a federal divided highway through Franconia Notch in New Hampshire's White Mountains. Since that time, CLF's legal advocacy has focused on several natural resources cases, including the cleanup of Lake Champlain, the prevention of overfishing of groundfish – cod, haddock, and flounder – off the coast of New England (resulting in a settlement requiring the National Marine Fisheries Service to produce a management plan to eliminate overfishing), and the protection of the Vermont black bear habitat (by obtaining a federal court injunction halting destructive U.S. logging practices in southern Vermont's fragile Lamb Brook wilderness area, marking the first time an environmental group in the Northeast successfully challenges the U.S. Forest Service's clear-cutting policies).

Cleanup of Boston Harbor
In 1983, CLF sued the Massachusetts Metropolitan District Commission (a division of the government of the state of Massachusetts) and the Environmental Protection Agency to clean up Boston Harbor, which had severely degraded water quality. The result of this and other litigation, including that of the City of Quincy, was to compel the state to comply with federal environmental laws and to build appropriate facilities to properly treat sewage discharged into Boston Harbor, and establish workable governmental mechanisms to finance the new facilities and pay for their continuing operations. The formation of the Massachusetts Water Resources Authority (MWRA), taking over the water facilities properties, operations, and legal authority previously held by the Metropolitan District commission, is one byproduct of the litigation. The legal battle was most intense from 1983 into the 1990s.

Community and transportation advocacy
Believing cities and towns to be as important environmental constituencies as forests and rivers, CLF advocated for increased light rail and public transportation options in Boston, New Hampshire, and Maine. In a pre-suit settlement with CLF, state highway officials in Massachusetts agreed to implement measures to reduce air pollution, including rail and transit improvements, as part of Boston’s Central Artery project (also known as the Big Dig).

Additionally, CLF advocated for state laws to protect children from the threat of lead poisoning. In 1988, following a three-year campaign by CLF, Massachusetts passed the nation’s toughest law to protect its citizens, especially children, from lead poisoning. More recently, CLF has continued its work to prevent lead poisoning in children by advocating for bills in New Hampshire and Vermont that require testing of school drinking water sources.

First marine national monument in the Atlantic Ocean 
CLF and its partners played a critical role in the designation of the first marine national monument in the Atlantic Ocean. President Barack Obama designated the Northeast Canyons and Seamounts Marine National Monument in September of 2016. The monument, located on Georges Bank, includes four underwater mountains and three deep-sea canyons. It protects ancient and fragile coral communities, endangered whales, and an abundance of unique and rare marine life, some found nowhere else in the world.

Climate change and energy advocacy
Climate change is the most significant challenge facing our communities and our planet today. One of the cornerstones of CLF's modern advocacy is pushing states to invest in clean energy sources to mitigate climate change. In 1983, CLF took credit for the decision by the Public Service Company of New Hampshire, the largest electric company in the state, to abandon its plans for a second nuclear unit at Seabrook Nuclear Power Station after CLF testimony demonstrated that the construction of the facility would not make financial sense.

Later, in 2003, CLF claimed victory when the Massachusetts Department of Environmental Protection finalized a schedule requiring the Salem Harbor and Brayton Point coal-fired power plants to significantly reduce harmful emissions and comply with the "Filthy Five" regulations. Both plants have since shut down their operations.

More recently, CLF played a critical role in blocking gas company Kinder Morgan from building a massive new pipeline through New England. CLF also intervened to help the Town of Burrillville, Rhode Island, prevent the construction of a large natural gas/oil-fired power plant – which would have polluted the area and contributed to climate change – from being built in the community.

Recent and current projects

Boston Harbor public access and resilience

While the clean-up of Boston Harbor has been a success, today, it faces new threats, including sea-level rise and efforts by some private developers to block public access to what is affectionately called the People’s Harbor. CLF is working to protect the public’s legal right to access the harbor and ensuring that the area is made resilient in the face of increasingly severe climate impacts.

Climate accountability 
Exposés by InsideClimate News and the Los Angeles Times have confirmed that oil giant ExxonMobil knew as early as the late 1970s that climate change caused by human activities would be devastating if left unchecked.

But instead of taking action, the corporation, along with other fossil fuel companies, funded an aggressive campaign to foment doubt about climate science. CLF started its own investigation, focused on how this climate deceit has affected New England communities. Its investigation revealed that, despite knowing the harm climate change could cause, ExxonMobil left its oil storage facilities in Everett, Massachusetts, and elsewhere vulnerable to flooding from storms and rising seas.

To hold ExxonMobil accountable for this inaction, CLF has launched the United States’ first legal action against the corporate giant for its climate deceit and for clean water act violations at its oil storage facility in Everett, which sits on the Mystic River. CLF has also pursuing similar cases against Shell Oil, Gulf Oil, and others in additional cities in New England.

State-level climate mandates 
CLF has worked with partners in every New England state to pass binding laws that require significant cuts in climate-damaging emissions by 2050. Climate scientists agree that, globally, nations must lower greenhouse gas emissions within 10 years to avoid catastrophic climate change. With federal climate action stymied, CLF and its partners have successfully pushed state governments in Massachusetts, Maine, Vermont, Rhode Island, and Connecticut to pass binding climate laws – or to update existing laws – to ensure accountability in meeting emissions targets, with the goal of achieving net zero emissions in New England by 2050.

Zero Waste Project 
Landfills and waste incinerators are dangerous and unsustainable. Their harmful impacts are felt most acutely by Environmental Justice (EJ) communities, which host a disproportionate number of these facilities compared to wealthier communities. Through the Zero Waste Project, CLF is raising awareness about the negative health and environmental impacts of trash and pushing forward solutions to reduce waste. Among other successes, CLF and partners successfully pushed Maine’s legislature to pass the first “Extended Producer Responsibility” bill in the country in 2021.

See also
A-CHAMP (Advocates for Children's Health Affected by Mercury Poisoning) (in the US)
Environmental Law Service (ELS) (a Czech non-governmental organization of lawyers)

References

External links
Conservation Law Foundation Home Page

Nature conservation organizations based in the United States
1966 establishments in the United States
Organizations established in 1966